This list of 2014 NFL draft early entrants consists of college football players who forfeited remaining collegiate eligibility and were declared by the National Football League (NFL) as eligible to be selected in the 2014 NFL draft. This includes juniors and redshirt sophomores who completed high school at least three years prior to the draft. A player that meets these requirements can renounce his remaining NCAA eligibility and enter the draft. Players had until January 15, 2014, to declare their intention to forgo their remaining collegiate eligibility.
A total of 98 underclassmen were granted eligibility for the 2014 draft, eclipsing the previous record from 2013 of 73.

In addition to the 98 underclassmen, at least four players who had already received degrees opted not to pursue an additional season of college eligibility for which they may have been eligible: Dion Bailey, Carl Bradford, Teddy Bridgewater and Adrian Hubbard. These players are included in the list below, bringing the total number of players entering the draft with eligibility remaining to 102.

Fourteen underclassmen – plus Teddy Bridgewater who graduated with eligibility remaining – were selected in the draft's first round. Sixty-two of ninety-eight underclassmen – 64 of 102 if the graduates are included – were selected in the draft.

Complete list of players

The following players were granted special eligibility to enter the 2014 draft:

Number of players granted special eligibility by year
Undergraduates admitted to the NFL draft each year:

References

External links 
 NFL draft website

2014 NFL draft early entrants
Draft early entrants
NFL Draft early entrants